Emil Axelsson (born 19 March 1986) is a Swedish ice hockey defenseman, who currently plays for Örebro HK in the second highest league in Sweden. In the 2004 NHL Draft, he was picked in the 7th round by the New York Islanders. He was drafted by the Islanders' former general manager, Mike Milbury. He is a defense-minded and physical player and spends a lot of time in the penalty box. He spent 240 minutes in the box in just 152 career games through the 2006–07 season.

Career statistics

Regular season and playoffs

International

References

External links
 

1986 births
Living people
New York Islanders draft picks
Örebro HK players
Swedish ice hockey defencemen
Sportspeople from Örebro